Full Circle is a collaborative album between musicians Holger Czukay, Jah Wobble and Jaki Liebezeit, released in 1982 through Virgin Records.

Track listing

Personnel 
Musicians
Holger Czukay – guitar, organ, piano, French horn, percussion, engineering, mixing, drum machine on "How Much Are They?", vocals on "Full Circle R.P.S. (No. 7)"
Jaki Liebezeit – drums, percussion, trumpet and backing vocals on "Full Circle R.P.S. (No. 7)"
Jah Wobble – bass guitar, vocals, synthesizer on "How Much Are They?"

Production and additional personnel
Mark Angelo Lusardi – mixing and recording on "How Much Are They?"
René Tinner – recording

References 

1982 albums
Collaborative albums
Holger Czukay albums
Virgin Records albums
Jah Wobble albums